Andy Agustin Rojas Guevara (born 2 October 1977) is a Venezuelan retired male volleyball player. He was part of the Venezuela men's national volleyball team. He competed with the national team at the 2008 Summer Olympics in Beijing, China. He played for Olympiacos in 2000–2001.
He was born in Caracas, Venezuela.

Clubs
  Olympiacos S.C. (2000–01)

See also
 Venezuela at the 2008 Summer Olympics

References

1977 births
Living people
Venezuelan men's volleyball players
Volleyball players at the 2008 Summer Olympics
Olympic volleyball players of Venezuela
Volleyball players at the 2003 Pan American Games
Pan American Games gold medalists for Venezuela
Olympiacos S.C. players
Sportspeople from Caracas
Pan American Games medalists in volleyball
VC Lokomotyv Kharkiv players
Medalists at the 2003 Pan American Games
20th-century Venezuelan people
21st-century Venezuelan people